Chhatradhar Mahato (born 1964) is an Indian political activist and convict from Lalgarh, West Bengal. He was the convener of the Police Santrash Birodhi Janasadharaner Committee ( – PCAPA) during Lalgarh insurgency.

He gained prominence following the Salboni blast in November 2008. In 2020, he joined Trinamool Congress (TMC). He was selected in the TMC State Committee in 2020 July. He was arrested by a team of NIA officials in the early hours of March 28 in connection with the murder of a Communist Party of India (Marxist) worker Prabir Mahato in 2009

Early life
Chhatradhar Mahato was born at a tiny hamlet of Amlia in Lalgarh. He is the eldest of three brothers. After his Higher Secondary examination from Lalgarh Ramakrishna Mission Vidyapith, he joined Midnapore College where he became an active member of the Chhatra Parishad, student wing of the Congress, inspired by Mamata Banerjee. He did not complete his college education. Mahto belonged to Kudmi Mahato agricultural caste.

Political prisoner status
In September 2012 Calcutta High Court granted Chhatradhar political prisoner status along with 8 other activist. This ruling made the centre consider challenging the decision, as they feared more naxalites would seek 'political prisoner' status.

Conviction
Court has convicted Mahato under Unlawful Activities Prevention Act (UAPA) along with other three PCPA member Sukhshanti Baske, Sambhu Soren and Sagun Murmu and sentenced to life imprisonment on 12 May 2015.

Political career 
After being released from jail, he joined TMC officially and was inducted in its State Committee in July 2020.

See also
Jagdish Mahto

References

1964 births
Living people
Naxalite–Maoist insurgency
Ramakrishna Mission schools alumni
Vidyasagar University alumni
Political activists
Prisoners and detainees of India